Diplotaxodon argenteus is a species of fish in the family Cichlidae. It is found in Malawi, Mozambique, and Tanzania. Its natural habitat is freshwater lakes.

References

argenteus
Taxa named by Ethelwynn Trewavas
Fish described in 1935
Taxonomy articles created by Polbot